Christopher Doyle, also known as Dù Kěfēng (Mandarin) or Dou Ho-Fung (Cantonese) (born 2 May 1952) is an Australian cinematographer. He has worked on over fifty Chinese-language films, being best known for his collaborations with Wong Kar-wai in Chungking Express, Happy Together, In the Mood for Love and 2046. Doyle is also known for other films such as Temptress Moon, Hero, Dumplings, and Psycho. He has won awards at the Cannes Film Festival and Venice Film Festival, as well as the AFI Award for cinematography, the Golden Horse award (four times), and the Hong Kong Film Award (six times).

Early life

Doyle was born in Sydney, Australia in 1952. He left his native country on a Norwegian merchant ship at the age of eighteen. Doyle arrived in Taiwan for the first time in the 1970s, while his ship was docked in Keelung Harbor. Doyle met Stan Lai and Ding Nai-chu at Idea House, a restaurant in Taipei.

Career
While living in other countries, he took on several odd jobs, such as an oil driller in India, a cow herder in Israel, and a doctor of Chinese medicine in Thailand. In the late seventies, Doyle took an interest in Chinese culture and received the Chinese name Dù Kěfēng, which translates to "like the wind". After language studies in Taiwan, he started working as a photographer. A couple of years later, he became a cinematographer, working with director Edward Yang in the 1983 film That Day, on the Beach.

Doyle has worked on over 50 Chinese-language films. He is best known for his collaborations with Wong Kar-Wai in Chungking Express, Fallen Angels, Happy Together, In the Mood for Love and 2046. He has collaborated with other Chinese filmmakers on projects including Temptress Moon, Hero and Dumplings. He has also made more than 20 films in various other languages, working as director of photography on Gus Van Sant's remake of Psycho, Liberty Heights, Last Life in the Universe, Rabbit-Proof Fence, Paranoid Park, and The Limits of Control, among others.

He also wrote, shot, and directed Warsaw Dark, Away with Words starring Asano Tadanobu, and Hong Kong Trilogy: Preschooled Preoccupied Preposterous, an experimental portrait of three generations of Hong Kong people. He co-directed The White Girl with Jenny Suen.

Awards

Among Doyle's 60 awards and 30 nominations are the Technical Grand Prize at the Cannes Film Festival for In the Mood for Love, as well as the Osella d’Oro for Best Cinematography for Ashes of Time at the Venice International Film Festival.

On 26 May 2017, Doyle was honoured during the 70th Cannes Festival with the “Pierre Angénieux ExcelLens in Cinematography” award, in tribute to his successful and influential career.

Filmography

As cinematographer

Feature films

Short films

As director
Feature films
 Away with Words (1999)
 Izolator aka "Warsaw Dark" (2008)
 Hong Kong Trilogy: Preschooled Preoccupied Preposterous (2015)
 The White Girl (2017), co-directed with Jenny Suen

Short films
 Home / Movie (1981)
 Paris, je t'aime (2006) – segment "Porte de Choisy"

Videos
  (2013) – musicvideo with lyrics by Ai Weiwei, music by Zuoxiao Zuzhou

As actor

 He had a cameo appearance in the 1996 film Comrades: Almost a Love Story in which he plays an English teacher who can speak Mandarin.

Bibliography
 Angel Talk (1996) – Behind the scenes photo book covering Fallen Angels – 
 Backlit by the Moon (1996) – Japanese photography monograph – 
 Photographs of Tamaki Ogawa (1996) – Japanese photography monograph – 
 Doyle on Doyle (1997) – Japanese photography monograph – 
 Buenos Aires (1997) – Behind the scenes photo book covering Happy Together – 
 Don't Cry for Me, Argentina (1997) – Photographic journal account of filming Happy Together – 
 A Cloud in Trousers (1998) – Gallery exhibition monograph – 
 There Is a Crack in Everything (2003) – Photography monograph
 R34g38b25 (2004) – Behind the scenes photo book covering Hero – 
Talking White - Behind-the-scenes photobook covering The White Girl (co-written with Jenny Suen)

See also
 Cinema of Hong Kong

References

External links
 Official website
 
 

Part 1, Part 2 and Part 3, interview with Christopher Doyle in three parts by Andreas Pousette, February 2005.

Video: Christopher Doyle talks about Hong Kong for CNN and Nokia’s feature series "The Scene".

1952 births
Australian cinematographers
Hong Kong cinematographers
Hong Kong photographers
Hong Kong people of Australian descent
Living people
Australian emigrants to Hong Kong
Male actors from Sydney
Australian expatriates in Hong Kong
Australian expatriates in Taiwan
Hong Kong film directors
Australian film directors
Australian male film actors
Australian male television actors
Hong Kong male film actors
Hong Kong male television actors
20th-century Australian male actors
21st-century Australian male actors